Potato Creek is a stream in the U.S. state of Georgia. It is a tributary to the Flint River.

Potato Creek's name most likely is a preservation of its native Creek-language name.

References

Rivers of Georgia (U.S. state)
Rivers of Lamar County, Georgia
Rivers of Spalding County, Georgia
Rivers of Upson County, Georgia